Leng Buai Ia Shrine is a Chinese shrine, in the Samphanthawong district of Bangkok's Chinatown. It is located in a courtyard among a network of narrow alleys off Charoen Krung Road.

History

The shrine is considered to be the oldest Chinese shrine in Thailand, based on a plaque contained inside with a Chinese inscription stating that it was built in 1658, during the Ayutthaya period. Thought to have originally been a Teochew-style shrine, it would have been used by Chinese businessmen aiming to improve the prosperity of their businesses and to establish social connections.

Style and Layout

Built in a classic Chinese architectural style, the shrine has a roof made of glazed colored tiles, adorned with two ceramic-clad dragons. The two main columns at the shrine entrance are also entwined by ceramic-clad dragons.

The shrine contains, at its center, an altar dedicated to Leng Buai Ia and his wife. To the left and right there are altars dedicated to the Martial Deity, Lord Guan (Guan Yu) and the Queen of Heaven, Tianhou respectively.

Near the entrance is an ancient bell attributed to the Daoguang Emperor, towards the end of the Qing dynasty.

Other items inside the shrine include three plaques from the reign of the Kangxi Emperor in the Qing dynasty, a bell inscribed with the name of Choen Thai Chue, and a container for incense sticks given as a gift from King Chulalongkorn (Rama V).

References

Buildings and structures in Bangkok
Religious buildings and structures completed in 1658
Religious buildings and structures in Bangkok
Samphanthawong district
Chinese shrines in Thailand
1658 establishments in Asia